Hands All Over is the third studio album by American pop rock band Maroon 5 which features guest appearances from American country band Lady Antebellum and singer Christina Aguilera. Produced by veteran producer Robert John "Mutt" Lange, the album was released by A&M Octone Records on September 15, 2010, and debuted at number two on the US Billboard 200. The standard edition of the album includes three singles: "Misery", "Give a Little More" and "Never Gonna Leave This Bed".

On July 12, 2011, the band re-released the album to include their summer hit and the fourth single "Moves like Jagger".

Background 
The band began writing the songs from the third album, after winding down from a world tour in support of their second album It Won't Be Soon Before Long. Several months later, the band received a phone call from Robert John "Mutt" Lange, who had heard the band were beginning to write a new album, and expressed an interest in producing it. In a press release on their official website, the album is described as "a killer hybrid of rock, pop, funk and R&B."

In an interview with Rolling Stone, the band revealed they spent two months writing and recording their third album with producer Robert John "Mutt" Lange in his recording studio in Lake Geneva, Switzerland. Lead singer Adam Levine, spoke about the experience of working with Lange: "He worked me harder than anyone ever has," [...] "I would come in with a finished song, and he'd say, 'That's a good start. Now strip it down to the drums and start over.' The coolest thing about him is that not only has he been a huge, legendary producer, but he also is a legit, serious writer."
Rolling Stone has said that the resulting disc is the band's brightest-sounding and poppiest yet and that it delivers Lange's mix of catchy hooks and punchy rhythms. Levine has also said about the album: "Our first record was a reflection of my love for Stevie Wonder. With the second I kept going back and forth between Prince and The Police. But there was no one on my mind for this album. It's just great pop." In a separate interview, however, Levine said that the album was influenced by Tupac Shakur and Marvin Gaye. The album artwork was revealed on July 1, 2010. The cover photo for the album was taken by 19-year-old photographer Rosie Hardy, who also serves as the model in the photo. Hardy took the photo herself in just under an hour, in her own bedroom from the town of Buxton, United Kingdom.

A web series titled Palm Trees & Power Lines, was released in three parts: Part 1 on August 23, Part 2 on October 11, and Part 3 on December 3, 2010, respectively. The series follows the band's journey on their 2010 promotional tour and performing with songs from the album.

Singles 
 The lead single to be taken from the album is "Misery". It was released on June 22, 2010. The music video for the single was directed by Joseph Kahn. The song reached #14 on the Billboard Hot 100.
 The second single is "Give a Little More", and was released on August 17, 2010. The music video was directed by Paul Hunter.
 The third single, "Never Gonna Leave This Bed", was released to Australian radio in January 2011. It was later released to the US mainstream radio on May 17, 2011. The music video for the song was shot on January 12, 2011 and premiered exclusively on Just Jared on February 4. The band performed the song on The Tonight Show with Jay Leno on January 17. The song debuted at #35 on the Billboard's Hot Adult Pop Songs and reached #55 on the Billboard Hot 100.
 The fourth and final single, "Moves like Jagger", featuring Christina Aguilera, was released on June 21, 2011, being the first single from the re-release of the album. The song debuted at number 8 on the Hot 100, the first Top 10 for Maroon 5 and Aguilera, since "Makes Me Wonder" and "Keeps Gettin' Better" respectively. The song peaked at #1 on the issue of August 31, 2011, making this song the band's second #1 (after "Makes Me Wonder" in 2007) and Aguilera's fifth number-one (after "Lady Marmalade" in 2001). The band performed the song several times, including on America's Got Talent, The Voice, The Today Show, The Ellen DeGeneres Show and Saturday Night Live.

Other songs 
 A music video for the title track "Hands All Over", premiered exclusively on Facebook, on December 22, 2010. Its music video, which was directed by Don Tyler and features stylized animations of the band members and a flirtatious nude woman.
 A music video for the song "Runaway" was released on April 5, 2011, and instead of featuring the five members of the band, this clip focuses on a surfer who enjoys riding the wave and finds solitude in the sea. 
 A music video for the closing track "Out of Goodbyes" (with country group Lady Antebellum) released on May 16, 2011, and was directed by Travis Schneider. The video features singer/actor Dwight Yoakam and actress Diora Baird. It shows the woman cleaning a bloody wound and removing a bullet from the man's chest, after which she gets up to leave, but grabs her revolver and shoots him. The song did not enter the Hot 100 chart, but it did peak at the Bubbling Under Hot 100 Singles chart at number three. 
 "Stutter" charted at #84 on the Billboard Hot 100, due to strong digital downloads when the album was released.

Critical reception 

Hands All Over received a weighted score of 63 out of 100 from review aggregate website Metacritic, indicating "generally favorable reviews", based on 10 reviews from music critics.

Stephen Thomas Erlewine from AllMusic rated the album very highly with 4.5 out of 5 stars, stating that: "Some of the cuts may not sink their hooks in immediately, but track for track Hands All Over is Maroon 5's best album, capturing their character and craft in a cool, sleek package". Bill Lamb from About.com was also positive, awarding it with 4 stars (out of 5), saying: "For their third studio album Maroon 5 add a bit more rock and it looks good on them. There is a loosening up in sound here while keeping the infectious hooks that have always been a major part of the group's appeal. Don't go looking for exceptional depth, but in a period in which mainstream pop sounds are ruling the charts again, Maroon 5 provide a good lesson in exactly how to make a solid pop album".

The IGN review rated Hands All Over seven-stars out of ten, claiming that the album is "programmed to hit all the bases: dance-y tracks, pop anthems, quasi-ballads. Almost every song on this record could be a single...Even though it's formulaic and delivers no surprises, fans of Maroon 5 should find exactly what they are looking for from this record." Jakob Dorof from Slant Magazines review was mixed saying, "It adds a few more gems to the band's growing cache of incredible pop singles and overlooked deep cuts, Hands All Over makes some decent contributions to what could wind up being Maroon 5's true redemption: a damn fine greatest hits record." The Los Angeles Times review says that: "Hands All Over reveals less about who frontman Adam Levine is than did Maroon 5's previous records; too often the songs cleave to opaque generalities". Hugh Montgomery in The Observer wrote that 'Jaunty funk-pop and blustery arena balladry remain the order of the day, while Adam Levine's falsetto whine still proffers all the emotional gravitas of a mosquito'.

Jody Rosen of Rolling Stone claimed, "at the helm, the dozen songs on Hands All Over are models of craftsmanship and efficiency ..." Fraser McAlpine of BBC Music noticed that "The rude guitar sleaze of Hands All Over, or the cocky glam-stomp in Stutter's verses show a band who are really at their best when they play pop music like the sleazy rockers they clearly are." The Boston Globe review felt that "This is lead singer Adam Levine's show. Thus, the band's success lives and dies with his delivery. That delivery remains technically sound, though as a whole, the band underwhelms here". The Now review also felt that "It's an accomplished record for singer Adam Levine and his faceless group, even if the whole affair sometimes sounds clinical in its approach". The Yahoo! Music UK review was mixed, saying that "It's hard to imagine how Hands All Over could have been any more underwhelming. In truth the only exceptional thing about it is just how average it is".  The Entertainment Weekly review concluded that "Hands, competent and studio-sleek as it is, too often begs for a fresher muse.

Commercial performance 
On the Billboard 200, the album debuted at number two, which despite a high placement sold a relatively weak 142,000 copies, compared to their previous effort, which debuted at number-one with 429,000 copies. In the second week, it dropped to #9. In November 2010, the album was certified Gold by RIAA, denoting a sales of at least 500,000 copies in the United States. In an interview with Billboard, Maroon 5 guitarist James Valentine expressed some frustration in the lackluster sales of the Hands All Over, saying a new album may be coming sooner than was originally planned. "Of course we could have liked it to have done better so far," Valentine told Billboard, "It hasn't sold at the pace that our previous records did." The lack of response to the latest record has the band thinking about recording another album sooner than they originally planned, but according to Valentine "that may not be a bad thing". However, on the week of September 24, 2011, the album returned to the top 10 for the first time since its second week on the chart last October, climbing from number 23 to number 7 with 29,000 copies sold. This was spurred on by a four-day $6.99 sale price in the iTunes Store as well as the success of "Moves like Jagger", and represented the album's best sales frame since its second chart week and highest rank since its debut. The album was certified platinum on January 9, 2012 and as of April 2012 it has sold 1,079,000 copies in the United States.

Track listings

Personnel 
Based on the liner notes of Hands All Over, A&M Octone Records.
Maroon 5
 Adam Levine – lead vocals, rhythm guitar
 Jesse Carmichael – keyboards, rhythm guitar, backing vocals
 Mickey Madden – bass guitar
 James Valentine – lead guitar, backing vocals
 Matt Flynn – drums, percussion

Additional personnel
 Denika Bedrossian – Grooming
 Brad Blackwood –  Mastering
 Bruce Bouton – Guitar
 Lenny Castro – Percussion
 Aristotle Circa – Wardrobe
 Scott Cooke – Editing
 Autumn de Wilde – Photography
 Lauren Dukoff – Portrait Photography
 Isha Erskine – Engineer
 Davis Factor – Portrait Photography
 Sam Farrar – Additional Production, Composer, Engineer, Programming
 Rosie Hardy – Back Cover Photo, Cover Photo
 Kelly Henson – Grooming
 Chad Hugo – Programming
 Lady Antebellum – Featured Artist
 Robert John "Mutt" Lange – Producer
 Noah Passovoy – Additional Production, Composer, Engineer, Programming
 Olle Romo – Engineer, Pro-Tools
 Eric Ivan Rosse – Programming
 Travis Schneider – Photography
 Mike Shipley – Engineer, Mixing
 Shawn Tellez – Composer
 Brian Wohlgemuth – Assistant, Pro-Tools

Charts

Weekly charts

Year-end charts

Certifications and sales

Release history

References

External links
 Hands All Over at Metacritic

2010 albums
Albums produced by Benny Blanco
Albums produced by Robert John "Mutt" Lange
Albums produced by Shellback (record producer)
Maroon 5 albums
A&M Octone Records albums
Interscope Records albums
Interscope Geffen A&M Records albums